Andy Brown (born 17 August 1963) is a footballer who played as a defender. He made one (non-contracted) appearance in the Football League for Tranmere Rovers during the 1982–83 season.

References

External links

Tranmere Rovers F.C. players
1963 births
Living people
Association football defenders
English Football League players
Footballers from Liverpool
English footballers